Georgi Stoyanov (born 24 September 1983) is a Bulgarian footballer, currently playing for Rakovski as a forward.

External links
 Profile
 

1983 births
Living people
Bulgarian footballers
First Professional Football League (Bulgaria) players
Second Professional Football League (Bulgaria) players
Association football forwards
PFC Vidima-Rakovski Sevlievo players
FC Spartak Plovdiv players
FC Lyubimets players